Lel Chamel  is a 2010 Tunisian film directed by Youssef Chebbi.

Synopsis
One pitch black night, on a remote beach, Mehdi and Nito, two smugglers of illegal immigrants, are about to seal a deal with the Albanese mafia. Things turn bad when Mehdi realizes that his younger brother Mouja is about to embark on this journey. Unaware of the real nature of the operation, the young man dreams of Europe and fortune. But Mehdi is ready to do anything to save his brother from the hands of the mafia.

Awards
 Vues d’Afrique, Montreal, 2011

External links

2010 films
French short films
Tunisian short films
2010s French films